Kathleen A. Fogarty (born July 29, 1965) is an American politician currently serving as a Democratic member of the Rhode Island House of Representatives, representing the 35th House District since 2015.

Personal life 
Fogarty was born in Warwick, Rhode Island on July 29, 1965. She was raised in Smithfield, Rhode Island graduated from Smithfield High School in 1983. Fogarty graduated from Providence College in 1987, with a Bachelor's degree in health service administration.

Fogarty is married to Brendan J. Fogarty. They have two children, Brendan and Laura.

Political career 
Fogarty first won election to the South Kingstown Town Council in 2002. Fogarty was reelected four times, before choosing not to run again in 2012. Fogarty served as the Council's vice president from 2004 to 2008 and as the Council's president from 2008 to 2010.

Fogarty was elected to the Rhode Island House of Representatives in 2014, after defeating incumbent Representative Spencer Dickinson in the Democratic primaries.

Fogarty currently sits on the House Environment and Natural Resources Committee and the House Health and Human Services Committee, as well as serving as the First Vice-Chair of the House Municipal Government and Housing Committee and the Chair of the House Special Legislation Committee.

Elections 

 2002 Fogarty was elected to the South Kingstown Town Council.
 2004 Fogarty placed second in the November 2, 2004 General election for the South Kingstown Town Council, receiving 6,115 votes (12.14%).
 2006 Fogarty placed third in the November 7, 2006 General election for the South Kingstown Town Council, receiving 6,432 votes (12.64%).
 2008 Fogarty placed first in the November 4, 2008 General election for the South Kingstown Town Council, receiving 7,515 votes (13.5%).
 2014 Fogarty challenged District 35 incumbent Democratic representative Spencer E. Dickinson in the September 9, 2010 Democratic primary, winning with 672 votes (51.3%) and won the November 4, 2014 General election with 2,113 votes (57.6%), defeating Republican nominee Lacey McGreevy.
 2016 Fogarty again defeated Spencer Dickinson in the September 13, 2016 Democratic Primary, winning with 584 votes (54.8%) and won the November 6, 2018 General election with 2,825 votes (57.7%), defeating independent Bruce K. Waidler.
 2018 Fogarty was unopposed in the September 12, 2018 Democratic Primary, winning with 1,078 votes and won the November 6, 2018 General election with 3,003 votes (69.6%), defeating independent John Brandon Monk.
 2020 Fogarty defeated Spencer Dickinson a third time in the September 8, 2020 Democratic Primary, winning with 1,182 votes (75.7%) and won the November 3, 2020 General election unopposed with 4,386 votes (95.6%).

References 

1965 births
Living people
Democratic Party members of the Rhode Island House of Representatives
People from South Kingstown, Rhode Island
Providence College alumni
Women state legislators in Rhode Island
21st-century American politicians
21st-century American women politicians